Hauke Jagau (born 1961 in Hanover, West Germany) is a German politician (SPD).

Career
Before being mayor of Laatzen the lawyer worked for SPD-Landtagsfraktion Niedersachsen, the State Ministry of Justice and the State Chancellery in the government of Minister-President Gerhard Schröder.

Since 2006, Jagau has been serving as the president of the Region Hannover. In September 2020, he announced that he would not stand for re-election in 2021 but instead resign from active politics by the end of his term.

In addition, Jagau is the vice-chairman of the SPD in Lower Saxony under the leadership of Stephan Weil as well as member of the managing committee of SPD-Bezirk Hannover.

Other activities

Corporate boards
 Sparkasse Hannover, Chairman of the Supervisory Board
 Commerzbank, Member of the Regional Advisory Board
 Norddeutsche Landesbank (NORD/LB), Member of the Advisory Board

Non-profits
 Robert Enke Foundation, Member of the Board of Trustees (since 2017)
 German Life Saving Association (DLRG), Member

References

External links
 Official website

Living people
Mayors of Hanover
Social Democratic Party of Germany politicians
20th-century German politicians
21st-century German politicians
1961 births